Jake Mosser is a former American actor. He is best known for playing the role of Andy Wilson in Another Gay Sequel: Gays Gone Wild! in 2008.

Filmography

Film

TV shows

References

External links

Year of birth missing (living people)
Living people
American male film actors
American male television actors